Ron Smale is the former president of the Ontario Soccer Association. He was first elected into the position in 2010. The trophy awarded to the regular season champions of the women's division of League1 Ontario is named after him.

References

Year of birth missing (living people)
Living people
Soccer people from Ontario